Pretty Nose (b.  1851) was an Arapaho woman who participated in the Battle of the Little Bighorn. She lived to be at least 101 years old and reportedly became a war chief.

Biography 
Pretty Nose was Arapaho, though in some sources she is referred to as Cheyenne. She was identified as Arapaho on the basis of her red, black and white beaded cuffs.

Pretty Nose took part in the Battle of the Little Bighorn in 1876 with a combined Cheyenne/Arapaho detachment.

Pretty Nose's descendant, Mark Soldier Wolf, became an Arapaho tribal elder who served in the US Marine Corps during the Korean War. She witnessed his return to the Wind River Indian Reservation in 1952, at the age of 101. At the time he reported her wearing cuffs that he said indicated she was a war chief.

Pretty Nose was portrayed in the 2017 novel The Vengeance of Mothers: The Journals of Margaret Kelly & Molly McGill by Jim Fergus.

Photographs

A photograph taken by Laton Alton Huffman  shows Pretty Nose with a young woman named Spotted Fawn.  One source from the Montana Memory Project implies that they were sisters. She appeared in several of silver prints by Huffman, and they are now part of the collection of the Princeton Library. Her photo is featured on the cover of The Spirit of Indian Women (Judith Fitzgerald and Michael Oren Fitzgerald, eds.).

See also
Buffalo Calf Road Woman
Moving Robe Woman
Minnie Hollow Wood
One Who Walks with the Stars

References

Notes

Citations

1850s births
Year of death missing
19th-century Native American women
Women in 19th-century warfare
Arapaho people
Native American women in warfare
19th-century Native Americans
20th-century Native Americans
People of the Great Sioux War of 1876
American centenarians
Year of birth uncertain
Women centenarians
20th-century Native American women